Infante Jaime of Spain, Duke of Segovia, Duke of Anjou (Spanish: Don Jaime Leopoldo Isabelino Enrique Alejandro Alberto Alfonso Víctor Acacio Pedro Pablo María de Borbón-Segovia y Battenberg; French: Jacques Léopold Isabellin Henri Alexandre Albért Alphonse Victor Acace Pierre Paul Marie de Bourbon; 23 June 1908 – 20 March 1975), was the second son of Alfonso XIII, King of Spain and his wife Princess Victoria Eugenie of Battenberg. He was born in the Royal Palace of La Granja de San Ildefonso in Province of Segovia, and was consequently granted the non-substantive title of "Duke of Segovia", courtesy he held along with "Duke of Anjou" as the Legitimist pretender to the French throne. Jaime was a great-grandchild of Queen Victoria of the United Kingdom.

Succession
Because he was deaf, as the result of a childhood operation, he renounced his rights to the defunct Spanish throne for himself and his descendants on 21 June,. He was then granted the title "Duke of Segovia" by King Alfonso XIII. After his father's death in 1941, he proclaimed himself the senior legitimate male heir of the House of Capet, heir to the defunct French throne, and head of the House of Bourbon. He then took the title of "Duke of Anjou" and became, in the opinion of French legitimists, the de jure king of France as "Henri VI", though to a minority as "Jacques II" (after 1957, he signed all documents as Jacques Henri). There were however a handful of legitimists who questioned his claim, given the rumors of his paternal grandfather's illegitimacy.

In 1921, he became the 1,153rd Knight of the Order of the Golden Fleece and Knight with Collar of the Order of Charles III and Grand Cross of the Order of Isabella the Catholic both in 1925 (Collar of the Order of Isabella the Catholic in 1931). Later in 1941, following the death of his father and his ascendance to the title of King of France, Jaime adopted the Order of the Holy Spirit as his own by his right to the French Throne.

Marriage and issue
On 4 March 1935, in Rome, Jaime married Victoire Jeanne Emmanuelle (Emanuela) Joséphine Pierre Marie de Dampierre (8 November 1913 in Rome – 3 May 2012 in Rome), daughter of Roger de Dampierre, 2nd Duke of San Lorenzo Nuovo, Vicomte de Dampierre (1892–1975) and of Donna Vittoria Ruspoli (1892–1982), daughter of Emanuele Ruspoli, 1st Principe di Poggio Suasa, and his third wife, English American Josephine Mary Curtis. Don Jaime and Donna Emanuela had two sons, named after Jaime's brothers, Alfonso and Gonzalo:

 Alfonso, Duke of Anjou and Cádiz (20 April 1936 – 20 January 1989); he married María del Carmen Martínez-Bordiú y Franco on 8 March 1972 and they were divorced in 1986. They had two sons and four grandchildren. 
 Gonzalo, Duke of Aquitaine (5 June 1937 – 5 March 2000); he married María Carmen Harto Montealegre on 18 April 1983. He remarried María de las Mercedes Licer García on 25 June 1984 and they were divorced on 31 January 1989. He remarried again Emanuela Maria Pratolongo on 30 June 1984 and they were separated on 7 March 1986. Gonzalo and Emanuela were also married in a religious ceremony on 17 September 1992. He has an illegitimate daughter and five grandsons.

Don Jaime and Emmanuelle de Dampierre divorced on 6 May 1947 in Bucharest (recognized by the Italian courts on 3 June 1949 in Turin but never recognized in Spain) and, on 3 August 1949 in Innsbruck, Don Jaime remarried civilly to divorced singer Charlotte Luise Auguste Tiedemann (2 January 1919 in Königsberg – 3 July 1979 in Berlin), daughter of Otto Eugen Tiedemann and wife Luise Amalia Klein. In the eyes of the Roman Catholic Church and of the French legitimists, Emmanuelle de Dampierre remained always his wife. The second marriage produced no children. His first wife remarried in Vienna, on 21 November 1949, to Antonio Sozzani (12 July 1918 in Milan – 6 January 2007 in Milan), son of Cesare Sozzani and wife Cristina Alemani, without issue.

Renunciation

On 6 December 1949, Don Jaime retracted his renunciation of the restored throne of Spain. On 3 May 1964, he took the title "Duke of Madrid" as head of a Carlist branch of the Spanish succession (recognized by the legitimist group of Carlists who did not support the Bourbon-Parma claim after Alfonso Carlos, Duke of San Jaime died in 1936). On 19 July 1969, Don Jaime definitively renounced the Spanish succession in favour of his nephew, the future King Juan Carlos I of Spain, at the request of his elder son, Alfonso de Borbón.

Don Jaime died in St. Gall Cantonal Hospital in Switzerland on 20 March 1975. He is buried at the Royal Monastery of San Lorenzo de El Escorial.

Ancestry

Heraldry

Notes

Bibliography
 Zavala, José M. Don Jaime, el trágico Borbón: la maldición del hijo sordomudo de Alfonso XIII. Madrid: La Esfera de los Libros, 2006. .
 Aranguren, Begoña. Emanuela de Dampierre: memorias, esposa y madre de los Borbones que pudieron reinar en España. Madrid: Esfera de los Libros, 2003. .
 Pedersen, Jørgen. Riddere af Elefantordenen 1559–2009, Odense: Syddansk Universitetsforlag, 2009. 

|-

|-

|-

1908 births
1975 deaths
People from the Province of Segovia
Legitimist pretenders to the French throne
Carlist pretenders to the Spanish throne
Knights of the Golden Fleece of Spain
Spanish infantes
Burials in the Pantheon of Infantes at El Escorial
Deaf royalty and nobility
Spanish monarchists
Spanish deaf people
Sons of kings
Navarrese titular monarchs
Royal reburials